Gando is a village in Burkina Faso, in the Centre-Est Region, the Boulgou province and the Department of Tenkodogo. Gando has about 2500 residents. The village became famous in 2004, when the architect Diébédo Francis Kéré, originating from Gando and living in Germany, received the prestigious Aga Khan Award for Architecture for the construction of the Gando primary school.

Gallery

External links 
 Article in Washington Post 

Populated places in the Centre-Est Region